The royal chronicles of Myanmar (also known as Burmese chronicles) are detailed and continuous chronicles of the monarchy of Myanmar (Burma). The chronicles were written on different media such as parabaik paper, palm leaf, and stone; they were composed in different literary styles such as prose, verse, and chronograms. Palm-leaf manuscripts written in prose are those that are commonly referred to as the chronicles. Other royal records include administrative treatises and precedents, legal treatises and precedents, and censuses.

The chronicle tradition was maintained in the country's four historical polities: Upper Burma, Lower Burma, Arakan and the Shan states. The majority of the chronicles did not survive the country's numerous wars as well as the test of time. The most complete extant chronicles are those of Upper Burma-based dynasties, with the earliest extant chronicle dating from the 1280s and the first standard national chronicle from the 1720s.

The subject matter of the chronicles is mainly about the monarchs, and the chronicles provide little information about the general situation of the kingdom. Nor were they written solely from a secular history perspective but rather at times to provide "legitimation according to religious criteria" of the monarchy. Nevertheless, the chronicles' "great record of substantially accurate dates" goes back at least to the 11th century. Latest research shows that even the pre-11th century narratives, dominated by legends, do provide a substantially accurate record of "social memory", going back over three millennia.

Myanmar possesses the most extensive historical source material in Southeast Asia, and the Burmese chronicles are the most detailed historical records in the region. Yet much of the extant Burmese records have not been properly maintained, and many of the less well-known chronicles are yet to be studied systematically.

Overview

The Burmese royal chronicles are "detailed and continuous registers of events in chronological order", revolving "chiefly around the Burmese kings". The chronicles by themselves offer little or no commentary on the situation of the kingdom of the regular people inside or outside the capital unless the king happened to be involved in the event. Other royal records such as legal treatises and precedents (dhammathats) and censuses (sittans) and the chronicles of regional courts as well as temple histories (thamaings) need to be consulted to get a glimpse of the life outside the palace.

The royal records were written on different media and in different literary styles. They can be inscriptions on stone and bells, or more commonly, they were written on palm-leaf manuscripts and on special thick sheets of paper called parabaiks. They also came in different literary styles: in prose (yazawins (  and ayedawbons; in verse (eigyins and mawguns); and as chronograms (yazawin thanbauk).

The prose versions are those most commonly referred to as the chronicles. In general, Yazawins ("chronicle of kings" from Pali rāja-vaṃsa) are a record of events in chronological order of kings organised by dynasties whereas ayedawbons ("memoirs of royal events/struggles") are more detailed records of more celebrated kings. These definitions are loose generalisations: some ayedawbons are full-fledged chronicles of several kings (e.g., Razadarit Ayedawbon) or even dynasties (e.g., Dhanyawaddy Ayedawbon) while some yazawins such as Zatadawbon Yazawin and Yazawin Kyaw have narrower scopes.

Inscriptions

Inscriptions, most of which were set up by the kings, the royal families and their court officials as well as wealthy families, are the earliest surviving royal records. Most surviving inscriptions are from religious dedications, and contain valuable historical material; indeed, they represent the primary extant historical record down to the 16th century.

Inscriptions are considered most accurate of all Burmese historiographic material because they are less susceptible to copying errors due to their longevity. A typical stone inscription lasts many centuries while the average life of a palm leaf record is only 100 to 150 years. Though some stone inscriptions too were recast, and some copying errors (mostly in spelling) have been identified, they do not show the same degree of copying errors of palm-leaf records, many of which were recopied many times over. The oldest extant inscriptions in Burma are dated to the 3rd and 2nd centuries BCE in Pyu city-states. Inscriptions were still "rare in the 5th to the 10th centuries but from the 11th, there is literally a deluge of them". The earliest original inscription in Burmese is dated 1035 CE; an 18th-century recast stone inscription points to 984 CE.

Inscriptions have been invaluable in verifying the events described in the chronicles written centuries later. The Myazedi inscription (1112), for example, confirmed the reign dates of kings Anawrahta to Kyansittha given in Zatadawbon Yazawin while disproving  Hmannan's dates for those. (Myazedi, inscribed in four scripts, is the Rosetta Stone that helped unlock the Pyu language.) Likewise, King Bayinnaung's Shwezigon Pagoda Bell Inscription (1557) provides the exact dates of 17 key events of his first six years in power, enabling modern historians to check the chronicles. However, not all inscriptions are reliable records of secular events. The famous Kalyani Inscriptions (1479), for example, make claims of legitimacy of the Hanthawaddy monarchy on religious grounds.

Myanmar possesses the largest number of historical stone inscriptions as well as most complete historical records in all of Southeast Asia. The first systematic effort to preserve the inscriptions was launched by King Bodawpaya per the royal order dated 23 July 1783 to check then existing chronicles with inscriptional evidence. By 1793, over 600 inscriptions from throughout the country were copied (recast), and kept at the capital Amarapura. European scholars in the British colonial period greatly expanded the collection effort, with a 1921 edition of Epigraphia Birmanica by Charles Duroiselle listing some 1500 inscriptions in original spelling and a large photograph of each text. The most complete set of inscriptions, called She-haung Myanma Kyauksa Mya (lit. "Ancient Inscriptions of Myanmar") was only recently published by Yangon University's Department of Archaeology in five volumes from 1972 to 1987. Aside from over 500 Pagan period inscriptions, most of the other stone inscriptions have not been studied systematically.

Early chronicles

Early chronicles on palm-leaf manuscripts are those written prior to the 18th century when national chronicles first emerged. Of the earliest chronicles, those of Pagan and early Ava (to early 15th century), whose names have been mentioned in inscriptions and later chronicles, only two supplementary chronicles from the late 13th and early 15th centuries survived. The rest of early chronicles date only from the 16th century.

Many of the early chronicles did not survive for a number of reasons. First, the earliest manuscripts prior to the 15th century were rare and extremely costly. (A 1273 Pagan manuscript of Tripiṭaka cost 3000 kyats of silver, which could buy over 2000 hectares of paddy fields.) The cost of producing manuscripts (creating as well as recopying) did come down in the Ava period as literacy rates improved, and the Burmese literature "grew more voluminous and diverse". Even then, most did not survive warfare, the main factor in destruction of historical records in Burmese history. Burmese history is littered with instances of conquering forces destroying the conquered's records: Pagan records in 1287 during the Mongol invasions; Ava records in 1525 and in 1527 by the armies of Confederation of Shan States; Hanthawaddy records in 1565 by a rebellion; Toungoo records in 1600 by Mrauk-U forces; more Toungoo records in 1754 by Restored Hanthawaddy; remaining Hanthawaddy records in 1757 by Konbaung forces; Arakanese records in 1785 by Konbaung; Konbaung records in 1885 by the British. Perhaps not surprisingly, the most complete surviving chronicles are those of Upper Burma-based dynasties, which often were the victors of the wars. Even for those that survived the wars, "there were no record-room methods; mildew, ants, the accident of fire prevented many manuscripts reaching a great age". Those that survived did so only because private individuals outside the capital had painstakingly copied the original palm leaf manuscripts. The survival of the manuscripts was also facilitated by the increasing literacy rates in the Irrawaddy valley. In the 15th century, when the literacy rate was still low, the scribal work was chiefly handled by monks, but by the late 18th century, it was routinely handled by commoners as adult male literacy exceeded 50 percent.

As a result, the earliest surviving "chronicles" were not even the full official chronicles of their own era. The earliest extant chronicle, Zatadawbon Yazawin ("The Royal Horoscopes Chronicle") first written in the late 13th century by court astrologers was primarily a record of regnal dates of Upper Burma's kings. Likewise, the next surviving chronicle, the Yazawin Kyaw ("The Celebrated Chronicle"), written in 1502, was mainly a religious document; only one-seventh of the treatise concerned the affairs of Burmese kings down to 1496. Indeed, it was not even meant to be an authoritative chronicle as its author stated there was already an existing chronicle of the Ava court.

In general, the early chronicles can be categorised as (1) histories of the rival kingdoms of 14th to 16th centuries, (2) ancient histories of kingdoms of previous eras (pre-14th century), and (3) biographies of famous kings.

Many of the early chronicles in some form had survived at least to the early 18th century since they were referenced by Maha Yazawin. An analysis of the passages of the chronicles directly quoted in Maha Yazawin shows that the referenced chronicles were most probably 16th century copies of the original chronicles, judging by their use of language, and most likely incomplete and partial copies, judging by their lack of specific dates, prior to the Toungoo period.

National chronicles
The first comprehensive national chronicle emerged only in 1724. Subsequent chronicles were heavily influenced by the first chronicle.

Maha Yazawin

The Maha Yazawin (Great Chronicle), completed in 1724 with a minor update in 1729, was composed by U Kala, an official at the Toungoo court. It was the first major chronicle in Burma to synthesize all the ancient, regional, foreign and biographic histories to which he had access. Kala weaved all the regional Burmese chronicles as well as foreign (Mahavamsa and the Ayutthaya Chronicle) together to form a consistent national narrative. Kala wrote three versions by length:  Maha Yazawin Gyi (full version, 21 volumes), Yazawin Lat (medium version, 10 volumes), Yazawin Gyok (abridged version, 1 volume). Since it was written in the late Toungoo period, Maha Yazawin provides its most specific information on dates and descriptions of various events Toungoo kings partook. It traces the life of each king chronologically, wherever possible, from his birth to the grave or his dethronement. However, its narrative of the earlier periods is far more sketchy, offering only the year, not the specific date, in most cases. It shows that Kala did not have the full versions of earlier chronicles, and that he did not check any inscriptions, which would have yielded more specific dates and double-checked the events.

Yazawin Thit

The next major chronicle, Yazawin Thit ("New Chronicle"), written in 1798, was an attempt to check Maha Yazawin with epigraphic evidence. (It is the first historical document in Southeast Asia compiled in consultation with epigraphic evidence. It shows that historians in Southeast Asia were using epigraphy for sourcing and verification around the same time as the practice was first used in Europe, even if Twinthin's methods may not have "evolved into a formal method".) Its author, Twinthin Taikwun Maha Sithu, consulted over 600 stone inscriptions, which he had collected and copied from around the kingdom between 1783 and 1793 per King Bodawpaya's decree, to verify the accuracy of Maha Yazawin. It was the only Burmese chronicle (other than Zatadawbon Yazawin) to organise itself by dynasties and periods whereas all others had been organised strictly along the linear order of kings, and the first to link the origins of Burmese monarchy to Buddhism.

The chronicle updates the events up to 1785, and contains several corrections and critiques of earlier chronicles. However, the chronicle was not well received, and ultimately rejected by the king and the court who found the critiques of earlier chronicles excessively harsh. It became known as A-pe-gan Yazawin (the "Discarded Chronicle").

Nonetheless, when Hmannan Yazawin, the first officially accepted chronicle of Konbaung Dynasty, appeared in 1832, it had incorporated many of Yazawin Thit's corrections, in particular regnal dates of Pagan period kings. Modern scholarship notes the chronicle's innovative use of epigraphy but does not find the chronicle's criticisms harsh. Rather, scholarship maintains that for its criticisms and corrections, the chronicle largely retains traditional narratives, and "was —as elsewhere in the world —written with didactic intentions".

Hmannan Yazawin

Hmannan Yazawin, known in English as the "Glass Palace Chronicle", was compiled by the Royal Historical Commission in 1829–1832. The chronicle covers events right up to 1821, right before the First Anglo-Burmese War (1824–1826). The commission consulted several existing chronicles and local histories (thamaings) and the inscriptions collected by Bodawpaya, as well as eigyins, poetry describing epics of kings and mawguns, panegyric poems. Although the compilers disputed some of the earlier accounts, they by and large retained the accounts of Maha Yazawin and Yazawin Thit. The most important development was Hmannan's disposal of the hitherto prevalent pre-Buddhist origin story of Burmese monarchy, and linkage of the monarchy to the clan of the Buddha and the first king of Buddhist mythology, Maha Sammata. (The head of the Royal Historical Commission, Monywe Sayadaw, also wrote a similar chronicle to Hmannan called Maha Yazawin Kyaw ("Great Celebrated Chronicle") in 1831. The learned monk had been writing the chronicle prior to his appointment, and completed his own chronicle because he did not agree with some of the points in Hmannan.)

The second part of Hmannan, also called the Second Chronicle, was written in 1867–1869 by another committee of scholars. It covers the events up to 1854, including the first two Anglo-Burmese wars. The Second Chronicle's account of the two wars, according to historian Htin Aung, was "written with the objectivity of a true historian, and the great national defeats were described faithfully in detail." The posthumous names of "Bodawpaya" ("Royal Lord Grandfather") and "Bagyidawpaya" ("Royal Lord Paternal Uncle") were introduced in this chronicle; the kings respectively were grandfather and paternal uncle to King Mindon who had commissioned the chronicle.

The third instalment came in 1905, nearly twenty years after the end of Burmese monarchy, and was written by Maung Maung Tin, who had a distinguished career in the British administration. Tin updated the chronicle to 1885, to the fall of the monarchy, relying mainly on the court records obtained from several members of the royal library and also on the papers seized by the British and kept in libraries. (Almost all the records of the Konbaung Dynasty had gone up in flames as drunken British soldiers burned down the royal library soon after King Thibaw's surrender in 1885.) Tin updated the chronicle in 1921, and included the death of King Thibaw in 1916 as a postscript.

List of national chronicles

The following is a list of standard chronicles with two notable exceptions. Though officially commissioned by King Bodawpaya, Yazawin Thit was not accepted by the Konbaung court as its official chronicle. It is included in this list because Hmannan retains many of Yazawin Thit's corrections. Likewise, Konbaung Set Yazawin or Hmannan Yazawin Part III was written after the monarchy was abolished, and thus not official.

Biographic chronicles

Usually named ayedawbons, biographic chronicles cover the life of more celebrated kings such as Razadarit, Bayinnaung, Nyaungyan and Alaungpaya in detail. Note: Razadarit Ayedawbon is actually the first half of the Hanthawaddy chronicle. At least two Alaungpaya biographies by different original authors exist. Hsinbyushin Ayedawbon is actually about the reign of King Bodawpaya, not the more famous Hsinbyushin and Bodawpaya's brother, King Hsinbyushin.

Regional chronicles
Regional chronicles are the histories of various small kingdoms such as (Hanthawaddy Kingdom and Mrauk-U Kingdom) and tributary vassal states (Early Toungoo, Prome, major Shan states of Lan Na, Kengtung, Hsenwi and Hsipaw) which maintained their own court and court historians. The regional chronicles were most relevant during the small kingdoms (warring states) period of Burmese history (14th to 16th centuries). The tradition of local court histories vanished in the Irrawaddy valley starting in the 17th century when Restored Toungoo kings integrated the entire valley into the core administrative system. The chronicle tradition continued only in farther major tributaries such as Kengtung and Lan Na, and indeed in the independent kingdom of Mrauk-U until it was conquered by Konbaung Dynasty in 1785.

Upper Burma

Ramanya

The original Mon language chronicles of the two main Mon-speaking kingdoms of the second millennium did not survive in their full form. The chronicles of the Hanthawaddy Kingdom (1287–1539, 1550–1552) were destroyed in 1565 during a rebellion led by ex-Hanthawaddy officials that burned down the whole city of Pegu (Bago). Likewise, most of the records of Restored Hanthawaddy Kingdom (1740–1757) were destroyed in 1757 by Konbaung forces. Therefore, the earliest extant chronicles are only parts of the original chronicles. The first half (1287–1421) of the original Hanthawaddy Yazawin had been translated into Burmese by Binnya Dala as Razadarit Ayedawbon before the 1565 rebellion, and the Burmese translation has survived. (To be precise, four oldest palm-leaf copies conjecturally dated to mid 18th century survived. In all, nine slightly different versions of existed according to a 1968 analysis by historian Nai Pan Hla. Pan Hla re-translated one of the versions back to Mon in 1958. He also wrote a new (tenth) version in 1968, synthesising the Burmese versions of Razadarit, Pak Lat'''s version, and the accounts in Hmannan as well as modern research.)

Other extant chronicles are even more limited in scope: they are mainly supplementary chronicles dealing with specific topics. Nidana Arambhakatha ("Preface to the Legend") covers the genealogy of kings, and was supposedly part of a larger treatise called Ramann'-uppatti-dipaka ("An Explanation of the Origins of Ramannadesa"). The surviving copy of Nidana is dated to the 18th century although the copy says its original manuscript was compiled in year 900 ME (1538/39 CE). Another chronicle called Gavampati, likely compiled between the 18th and 19th centuries, mainly covers the early (legendary) history, claiming its early monarchs' linkage to the Buddha.Aung-Thwin 2005: 145 Another 18th-century chronicle, Slatpat Rajawan Datow Smim Ron ("History of Kings"), written by a monk, was also a religion/legend-centric chronicle although it does cover secular history from Sri Ksetra and Pagan to Hanthawaddy periods. Like Gavampati, and Hmannan of the same period, Slatpat too linked its kings to the Buddha and Buddhist mythology.

Indeed, the most complete compilation of the history of Mon kingdoms would have to wait until 1910 and 1912 when Pak Lat Chronicles was published in a two-volume set. It was reportedly based on the stash of manuscripts found at Pak Lat, then an ethnic Mon enclave east of Bangkok. (The provenance and chronology of the manuscripts used in the publications are uncertain, and had not yet been studied by a Burma Mon scholar as of 2005.) Pak Lat weaves together all existing Mon narratives, including the history of Thaton Kingdom, Gavampati's linkage with the Buddha, the Hanthawaddy Chronicle from monarchs Wareru to Shin Sawbu (1287–1472), and Nidana's genealogy of kings.

Arakan

Although the earliest extant work of Arakanese literature in Arakanese (Burmese) script, Rakhine Minthami Eigyin ("Lullaby for a Princess of Arakan"), was written only in 1455, Arakanese chronicle tradition most likely began at least a century earlier. (The Burmese script had already been in use at the Arakanese court at least since the 1330s when the future King Swa Saw Ke of Ava was educated there. According to Pamela Gutman, the use of Burmese script appeared for the first time in the Le-Mro period (11th to 15th centuries) on stone inscriptions.) Much earlier Devanagari inscriptions exist (as early as c. 550 CE) but it does not appear that the Arakanese chronicles consulted the inscriptions in any case because later court historians could not read the earliest inscriptions. Indeed, to date, most of the inscriptions have not been fully examined, or translated.

Though Arakanese chronicles may have been written circa the 14th century, the earliest extant manuscripts date only from the 18th century. Most of Mrauk-U's historical works did not survive the burning of the royal library by the Konbaung forces in 1785. Only portions escaped the indiscriminate destruction. An Arakanese monk tried to salvage the wreckage as much as he could by promptly compiling the Dhanyawaddy Yazawin. He completed it in 1788 but the chronicle may not be as reliable as it is "a third-hand piece of work". Colonial period scholars had to piece together the extant portions of Maha Razawin (148 angas or 1776 palm-leaves), Do We's Rakhine Razawin (48 angas / 576 leaves), Saya Mi's Maha Razawin (24 angas / 288 leaves). In the late 20th century, historian San Tha Aung could confirm only eight of the supposed 48 historical works of Arakanese history. Even of the extant eight, he was unsure of the reliability of the information prior to 1000 CE.

All Arakanese Arakanese chronicles remain untranslated into English. It means the Arakanese accounts have not been open to (non-Burmese reading) international scholars. According to historian Michael Charney, the Arakanese accounts need to be checked since "the references to Arakan in the chronicles of Arakan’s neighbors, such as Pegu, Ayudhya, and Ava are on the whole biased or ill-informed."

Shan states
The rulers of Shan states, called saophas (sawbwas), held court even as they paid tribute to their larger neighbours. Some of the larger Shan states such as Lan Na (Chiang Mai), Kengtung, Hsenwi, Hsipaw and Mong Yawng also maintained their own histories down to the 19th century, similar to what other vassal states such as Prome and Toungoo did in the 14th and 16th centuries. (Lan Na was tributary to Burma from 1558 to 1775.) At any rate, only Lan Na and Kengtung, the two largest Shan states, had sizeable chronicles. Moreover, the earliest extant copies of Lan Na date only from the 18th century even though the original copy of Jinakalamali of Chiang Mai is said to have been compiled in 1527. The rest of the smaller Shan state chronicles (Hsenwi, Hsipaw, etc.) date only from the 19th century. Like their Burmese and Mon counterparts, various Shan chronicles also claim their sawbwas' descent from the clan of the Buddha, which British colonial period scholars took to be a sign of copying from Hmannan and as a sign of their recent nature. G.E. Harvey, a colonial period scholar, found the extant Shan chronicles "consistently reckless with regard to dates, varying a couple of centuries on every other leaf", and discarded them.

The Shan local histories were written in a variety of Shan scripts. Jinakalamali was originally written in Pali, Zinme Yazawin in Lan Na script, and Kengtung Yazawin in Khun script, for example. (At least six Shan scripts—Tai Long, Tai Hkamti, Tai Neu, Khun, Tai Yun (Kengwi), Tai Yun (Lan Na) were in use in Burmese Shan states.) Excluding Lan Na chronicles, only Kengtung Yazawin has been fully translated into English as the Padaeng Chronicle and the Jengtung State Chronicle. (Two Lan Na chronicles of the Chiang Mai Chronicle and the Nan Chronicle have also been translated into English.)

Miscellaneous
There are also chronicles that fall outside of general categorisation. Pawtugi Yazawin covers the history of the Portuguese, especially their rule at Syriam (Thanlyin) from 1599 to 1613. Dawei Yazawin and Myeik Yazawin are chronicles of Tavoy (Dawei) and Myeik (Mergui), compiled after the Burmese conquest of Tenasserim in 1765.

Supplementary sources

Chronicles in verse

The chronicles were also written in verse, chiefly in eigyin or mawgun forms, and secondarily in the form of yazawin thanbauk. Eigyins are elaborate lullabies for young princes and princesses, written to inform the royal children of their genealogy and the achievements of their forebears. Since the antiquity of the royal family's genealogy  mattered greatly, the poets did their best to trace the ancestors as far back as they could, with considerable use of their own imagination. The earliest eigyin (Mauktaw Eigyin, or more commonly known as Rakhine Minthami Eigyin) dates from 1455, and is also the earliest extant Burmese poetry on palm-leaf. Over 40 royal eigyins are on record. Mawguns are panegyric poems, composed as a rule to commemorate an important event. The subjects range from the arrival of a white elephant at the court to the conquest of Siam, from the completion of a canal to an essay on cosmology. The earliest mawgun dates from 1472. The poet's duty was to glorify the event in an ornate language in verse. There are more than 60 extant mawguns. Both eigyin and mawgun were composed in four-syllable lines, albeit in different styles. A few yazawin thanbauks, or historical epigrams or chronograms, from the 18th and 19th centuries have also survived. The often lengthy thanbauks list the pairings of year dates to historical events.

With their poetical imagery and excessive glorification, eigyins, mawguns and thanbauks are of high literary value but of limited historical value. Some of the more well known chronicles in verse are:

Administrative treatises and precedents
Court scholars also wrote administrative treatises and precedents. The two most well known, Zabu Kun-Cha Po Yaza Mu Haung ( early 15th century) and Mani Yadanabon (1781) are compilations of precedents but also provide an outline of the prior dynasties down to the era in which they were written. Mani Yadanabon, for example, is "a repository of historical examples illustrating pragmatic political principles worthy of Machiavelli". Furthermore, many of these treatises—expositions on institutions, royal insignia, ranks and technical terms—help interpret the chronicles since many of the terms are obsolete.

Law treatises and precedentsDhammathats are treatises on law used by Burmese royal courts. Hpyat-htons (also spelled pyattons) are legal precedents by earlier kings. The earliest extant legal treatise Dhammavisala Dhammathat dates from the 12th century while the more well known Mon language Wareru Dhammathat dates from the 1290s. The earliest dhammathats were mainly written in Pali, and were accessible only to the court elite and clergy. Though modeled after the Hindu legal treatise Manusmriti in terms of organization, the content of Burmese dhammathats is mostly Burmese customary law with early dhammathats containing "between 4% and 5%" of the Hindu legal treatise Manusmriti. The Wareru was translated into Burmese, Pali and Siamese, and was the basic law of the First Toungoo Empire.Htin Aung 1967: 127 After the empire's fall in 1599, the Code lived on—albeit in adapted forms—in the main successor states. In Siam, it coexisted with other legal codes until King Rama I compiled a new legal code in 1805. The new Siamese law's core 18 chapters share "substantial similarities to King Wareru's code", and the new code adds 21 more chapters. In Burma, the Code morphed into a more Buddhist-centric version by 1640. The new treatise often supports Burmese customary law "with explicitly Buddhist scriptural justifications".Lieberman 1993: 248

An 1899 analysis by historian U Gaung lists a total of 36 dhammathats that had survived in some form. Some of the more well known law treatises and precedents are:

CensusesSittans, or censuses/revenue inquests, were used by the kings to determine their tax collection and military manpower base. The censuses collected data on the size of population, number and description of villages, arable land, products and taxes. Kings since Pagan times had graded each town and village by the taxes and levy it could raise. The first known instance of a sittan was ordered per the royal decree dated 12 March 1359 while the first nationwide census was commissioned in 1638. The next two national censuses were commissioned in 1784 and 1803. The 1784 census shows the kingdom had a population of 1,831,487, excluding "wild tribes" and the recently conquered Arakan.

Histories of religion and religious monuments
The country's many pagodas and temples also maintain a historical record, usually a stone and/or bell inscription, called thamaing. They furnish important historical information about the religious dedications by the royalty and the wealthy donors. Each thamaing purports to give the history of the founder of the building and of its subsequent benefactors. Such documents include notices of secular events. In addition, some learned monks also wrote chronicles on the history of Buddhism from the time of the Buddha to their present day. The two well known religious chronicles are:

Analysis

Quantity

The overall number of the chronicles outside the inscriptions is "modest" due to their destruction in the country's repeated bouts of warfare. Most of the extant material is that of Upper Burmese dynasties, which by the virtue of winning the majority of the wars "possessed an abiding palace and a continuous tradition". The sparseness of the chronicles of Ramanya (Lower Burma), Arakan and Shan states belies the long histories of these former sovereign states, which for centuries were important polities in their own right. Even the Upper Burmese chronicles still have many gaps and lack specificity, especially with regard to pre-Toungoo (pre-16th century) eras.

Still, Myanmar has the highest amount of historical source material in all of Southeast Asia. British colonial period scholars, who were the first ones to reconstruct Burma's history in a "scientific" way and made invaluable efforts to systematically preserve the records, and cast a highly sceptical eye toward the chronicle narratives, nonetheless praised the relative completeness of the extant Burmese material compared to those of Southeast Asian and even Indian states. D.G.E. Hall summarises that "Burma is not the only Southeast Asian country to have large collections of this indispensable source material and precious heritage of the past; no other country surpasses her."

Scope
The scope of the chronicles is rather narrow. The coverage mostly revolves around the activities of the monarch and the royal family, and offers little perspective on the general situation of the kingdom outside the palace unless the monarch happened to be involved in the event. Remote regions would make an appearance only if they were part of the king's itinerary, or were involved in rebellions or military campaigns. Other records—legal and administrative treatises, censuses and regional chronicles—do provide valuable complementary views. On balance, however, the royal records overall remain heavily monarch-centered: they "tell little of general conditions, and their story is not of the people of Burma but simply that of the dynasties of Upper Burma."

Influences
The earliest chronicles, such as Yazawin Kyaw and Maha Yazawin were modelled after Mahavamsa. The early Buddhist history (and mythology) came right from the Sri Lankan chronicle. But much of the extant chronicle tradition (both in prose and verse) and the "sophistication in use and manipulation of an expanded Burmese vocabulary and grammar" are legacies of the Ava period.

The Burmese chronicles have been used in Thai historians' effort to reconstruct the Thai history before 1767 for the original Siamese chronicles were destroyed during the sack of Ayutthaya by the Burmese army. In particular, the pre-1767 chronology of Thai history follows that of Burmese chronicles. (The prior reconstructed dates of the 19th century Siamese chronicles had been off by nearly two decades before historians realised it in 1914.)

Historicity and accuracy

The chronicles can be divided in two parts: the early mythical origin legends and later factual history. The chronicle narratives start out with early origin myths, and eventually, they slowly change from being mythical to largely factual. Historians treat the Pagan Empire period (1044–1287) as the dividing period between mythical legends and the factual history. The Pagan period narratives still contain a number of legends—according to Harvey, "half the narrative told as historical down to the 13th century is probably folklore"—but the period's "deluge" of inscriptions provide a wealth of information to check the veracity of these narratives. Even the later portions of the chronicles, which have been shown to be largely factual, still were not written purely from a secular history perspective but rather also achieve what Aung-Thwin calls "legitimation according to religious criteria" of the Burmese monarchy.

Early history (pre-11th century)
Reconstruction of this part of the early Burmese history has been ongoing, and the views of the scholarship evolving. European scholars of the colonial period saw in the narratives mostly the "legends" and "fairly tales", and outright dismissed all of early history as "copies of Indian legends taken from Sanskrit or Pali originals". They highly doubted the antiquity of the chronicle tradition, and dismissed the possibility that any sort of civilisation in Burma could be much older than 500 CE.Harvey 1925: 307–309 This assessment was the mainstream view at least to the 1960s. Some did vigorously challenge the views but the dismantling of the views would have to wait until more archaeological evidence came in.

Modern scholarship, with the benefit of latest research, now holds a far more nuanced view. Latest research shows that when stripped of the legendary elements, which are now viewed as allegories, the chronicle narratives largely conform to the evidence. Archaeological evidence shows that many of the places mentioned in the royal records have indeed been inhabited continuously for at least 3500 years. For example, at Tagaung, the site of the first Burmese kingdom according to the chronicles, the latest evidence supports the existence of both Tagaung eras (c. 9th century BCE to 1st century CE) reported in the chronicles. On the other hand, evidence suggests many of the early "kingdoms" (Tagaung, Sri Ksetra and Pagan) were contemporary to each other for long periods, and did not exist in a serial fashion as reported in the chronicles. The chronicle narratives of the pre-11th century history are social memory of the times.

Post-Pagan
The royal records become increasingly more factual where "after the 11th century, the chronology of Burmese chronicles is reliable." One major reason is that Burmese chroniclers could read the inscriptions of the previous eras. It was not the case in Champa, Cambodia and Siam, where "scripts have in the course of centuries undergone such profound changes that the compilers of later chronicles could not read the earlier inscriptions". Likewise, a 1986 study of Maha Yazawin'' by Lieberman finds much of the history for the 16th century, which was also witnessed by many Europeans, largely factual. To be sure, the post-Pagan narratives are not without issue. According to Harvey, "the chronicles abound in anachronisms, and in stock situations which recur regularly"; the chroniclers regarded "general conditions in early times being the same as those in their own day, the 18th century". Moreover, the troop figures reported in the chronicles for the various military campaigns are at least an order of magnitude higher than the actual number possible given the size of the population and transportation mechanisms of the era.

Current status
Despite Myanmar's possession of large amounts of historical material, many of the records have not been properly maintained, or used for research. The National Library of Myanmar holds 10,000 bundles of palm-leaf manuscripts, which have been collected from private donations and monasteries. Many more rolls of palm-leaf manuscripts remain uncollected, and are moldering in monasteries across the country without proper care as well as under attack by unscrupulous treasure hunters. Efforts to digitise the manuscripts have not materialised. Few have been studied systematically since the Burma Research Society closed the doors in 1980. The society had published the Journal of the Burma Research Society (JBRS) over (1300 articles in 59 volumes) between 1910 and 1980.

See also

Notes

References

Bibliography
 
 
 
 
 
 
 
 
 
 
 
 
 
 
 
 
 
 
 
 
 
 
 
 
 
 
 
 
 
 
 
 
 
 
 
 
 
 
 
 
 
 
 
 
 
 
 
 
 
 
 

 
History of Myanmar